The 1908 Dartmouth football team represented Dartmouth College in the 1908 college football season. They finished with a 6–1–1 record and outscored their opponents 97 to 17. George Schildmiller and Clark Tobin were consensus All-American.

Schedule

References

Dartmouth
Dartmouth Big Green football seasons
Dartmouth football